is a Japanese racing driver currently competing in Super Formula for Drago Corse.

Career

Karting 
In 2010, Fukuzumi began karting, starting his racing career. He remained in karting until 2013, with his best achievement being second place in the ROK Cup International Final in the Super ROK category

Lower formulae 
In 2014, he began to compete in open-wheel racing, moving up to Japanese F3 the next year. He won four races and finished fourth in the standings.

GP3 Series 
In 2016, Nirei débuted in the GP3 Series with ART Grand Prix, scoring three podium finishes and finishing seventh in the championship. Fukuzumi stayed on for another season of GP3 in 2017. He racked up two victories, both coming at feature races, and ended up third in the standings, only behind teammates George Russell and Jack Aitken. In 2017, he was part of McLaren Young Driver Programme as he's part of Honda Junior Program.

FIA Formula 2 Championship 
The Japanese driver made his Formula 2 debut in 2018 with BWT Arden, partnering Maximilian Günther. In that season, he managed to join Red Bull Junior Team. Fukuzumi scored a total of 17 points, finishing 17th, three positions behind Günther in the championship. After this unfortunate season, Red Bull dropped him from the Academy.

Super Formula & Super GT 
While the main focus was to race in Formula 2 for 2018, Fukuzumi competed in Super Formula with Team Mugen for 4 rounds. After 3 seasons in Europe, Fukuzumi returned to Japan, and competed in Super Formula with Dandelion Racing & Super GT GT300 with ARTA as Shinichi Takagi's teammate. In that season, he managed to claim the Super GT GT300 Title, while in Super Formula full debut managed to get 7th place in the standings. 
In 2020, he stayed with the same team in both series but promoted to GT500 class in Super GT with Tomoki Nojiri as his teammate. For 2021, He stays with the same team in both series. Fukuzumi had his best season by far, managed to claim runners up in the standings for Super Formula with 2 wins & 1 pole to his name in that season, and Super GT with 1 win. For 2022, Fukuzumi moves from Front runner Dandelion Racing to Drago Corse for Super Formula, while for Super GT stays with ARTA.

Karting record

Karting career summary

Racing record

Career summary

† As Fukuzumi was a guest driver, he was ineligible to score championship points.
** The FC class was a class using modified Formula Challenge Japan's FC106 chassis and running with the JAF Formula 4's "C" class, an upper grade class. So, there were neither pole position nor fastest lap.

Complete Japanese Formula 3 Championship results
(key) (Races in bold indicate pole position) (Races in italics indicate fastest lap)

Complete GP3 Series results
(key) (Races in bold indicate pole position) (Races in italics indicate fastest lap)

Complete FIA Formula 2 Championship results
(key) (Races in bold indicate pole position) (Races in italics indicate points for the fastest lap of top ten finishers)

† Driver did not finish the race, but was classified as he completed over 90% of the race distance.

Complete Super GT results 
(key) (Races in bold indicate pole position; races in italics indicate fastest lap)

† As Fukuzumi was a guest driver, he was ineligible to score championship points.
‡ Half points awarded as less than 75% of race distance was completed.

Complete Super Formula results
(key) (Races in bold indicate pole position) (Races in italics indicate fastest lap)

References

External links
 

1997 births
Living people
Sportspeople from Tokushima Prefecture
Japanese racing drivers
Japanese Formula 3 Championship drivers
GP3 Series drivers
FIA Formula 2 Championship drivers
Super Formula drivers
ART Grand Prix drivers
Super GT drivers
Arden International drivers
Mugen Motorsports drivers
Dandelion Racing drivers
Karting World Championship drivers
Team Aguri drivers